The 1971 Rutgers Scarlet Knights football team represented Rutgers University in the 1971 NCAA University Division football season. In their 12th season under head coach John F. Bateman, the Scarlet Knights compiled a 4–7 record and were outscored by their opponents 243 to 193. The team's statistical leaders included Leo Gasienica with 1,148 passing yards, Larry Robertson with 405 rushing yards, and Bob Carney with 351 receiving yards.

The Scarlet Knights played their home games at Rutgers Stadium in Piscataway, New Jersey, across the river from the university's main campus in New Brunswick.

Schedule

References

Rutgers
Rutgers Scarlet Knights football seasons
Rutgers Scarlet Knights football